A list of Spanish-produced and co-produced feature films released in Spain in 1998. The domestic theatrical release date is favoured.

Films

Box office 
The ten highest-grossing Spanish films in 1998, by domestic box office gross revenue, are as follows:

See also 
 13th Goya Awards

References

External links
 Spanish films of 1998 at the Internet Movie Database

1998
Spanish
Films